Papilio epiphorbas is a butterfly of the family Papilionidae. It is found in Madagascar and the Comoro Islands.

Taxonomy
Papilio epiphorbas is a member of the oribazus species-group. The clade members are
Papilio oribazus Boisduval, 1836
Papilio epiphorbas Boisduval, 1833
Papilio nobilis Rogenhofer, 1891

Subspecies
Papilio epiphorbas epiphorbas (Madagascar)
Papilio epiphorbas guyonnaudi Turlin & Guilbot, 1990 (Anjouan)
Papilio epiphorbas praedicta Turlin & Guilbot, 1990 (Grand Comore)

References

Carcasson, R.H 1960 The Swallowtail Butterflies of East Africa (Lepidoptera,Papilionidae).Journal of the East Africa Natural History Society pdf Key to East Africa members of the species group, diagnostic and other notes and figures. (Permission to host granted by The East Africa Natural History Society

External links
Butterfly corner Images from Naturhistorisches Museum Wien

Butterflies described in 1833
epiphorbas
Lepidoptera of the Comoros
Lepidoptera of Madagascar